Stromanthe is a genus of flowering plants in the family Marantaceae, native to the tropical portions of the Americas from Mexico to Trinidad to northern Argentina.

 Species
 Stromanthe angustifolia - Bolivia
 Stromanthe bahiensis - Bahia
 Stromanthe boliviana - Bolivia, NW Argentina
 Stromanthe confusa - Bolivia
 Stromanthe glabra - E + S Brazil
 Stromanthe guapilesensis - Costa Rica
 Stromanthe hjalmarssonii - Belize, Guatemala, Honduras, Nicaragua
 Stromanthe idroboi - Colombia, Venezuela
 Stromanthe jacquinii - Nicaragua, Panama, Colombia, Venezuela, Ecuador
 Stromanthe macrochlamys - S Mexico, Central America, Colombia
 Stromanthe palustris - Costa Rica
 Stromanthe papillosa - SE + S Brazil
 Stromanthe popolucana - Veracruz
 Stromanthe porteana - E Brazil
 Stromanthe ramosissima - Ecuador
 Stromanthe sanguinea - Brazilian and Peruvian Amazon (synonym of S. thalia)
 Stromanthe schottiana - E + SE Brazil
 Stromanthe sellowiana - Bahia, Rio de Janeiro
 Stromanthe stromanthoides - Colombia, Peru, Ecuador, Acre
 Stromanthe thalia - SE Brazil
 Stromanthe tonckat - Trinidad, much of tropical Central + South America

References

External links

 
Zingiberales genera
Taxonomy articles created by Polbot